Brimstone Creek is a river in Schoharie County and Montgomery County in New York. It begins east of the Village of Sharon Springs and flows mostly in a northwest direction before flowing into Canajoharie Creek north-northwest of the Village of Ames.

References 

Rivers of New York (state)
Rivers of Montgomery County, New York
Mohawk River